There's Always Woodstock is  an American comedy-drama film directed and written by Rita Merson and starring Allison Miller, Jason Ritter, Brittany Snow, Ryan Guzman, Katey Sagal, Rumer Willis and James Wolk. It was released on March 19, 2014.

Premise 
Catherine Brown (Allison Miller) is a workaholic songwriter who lives locked in her apartment in New York City. When her life falls apart she is forced to confront her past when she spends the summer at her childhood home in Woodstock.

Cast 
Allison Miller as Catherine Brown
James Wolk as Noah Bernstein
Rumer Willis as Emily
Jason Ritter as Garret
Brittany Snow as Jody
Katey Sagal as Lee Ann
Anna Anissimova as Ryan
Ryan Guzman as Dylan
Richard Reid as Ron Kleynerman
Alexie Gilmore as Sally
Richard Riehle as Mr. Harmon
Finesse Mitchell as Alex
Sean McNabb as Biker
Kate Lacey as Sally
Vanessa Dubasso as French Girl
Jim Klock as Dinner Guest

External links 

2014 films
Films set in Los Angeles
American comedy-drama films
2014 comedy-drama films
2010s English-language films
2010s American films